Hradiště is the Czech word for a Gord, a type of medieval Slavic settlement. It is also a common place name in the Czech Republic, and in Slovakia (spelled Hradište):

Places

Czech Republic
 Choustníkovo Hradiště
 Dolní Hradiště
 Hradiště (Benešov District)
 Hradiště (Domažlice District)
 Hradiště (Plzeň-South District)
 Hradiště (Rokycany District)
 Hradiště (Těrlicko)
 Klášter Hradiště nad Jizerou
 Mnichovo Hradiště
 Staré Hradiště
 Uherské Hradiště

Slovakia
 Hradište pod Vrátnom
 Hradište, Banská Bystrica
 Hradište, Poltár District
 Hradište, Trenčín

See also 
 Gradište (disambiguation) (South-Slavic form)
 Horodyshche (Ukrainian form)
 Gorodishche, Russia (Russian form)
 Grădiştea (disambiguation) (Romanian form)
 Grodziszcze (disambiguation) (Polish form)